Teenage Love may refer to:
Teenage Love (film), a 1991 Indian Malayalam film
Teenage Love (album), a 1994 album by Cold Chisel
Teenage Love, a 1960 album by Jerry Fuller
"Teenage Love" (song), a 1988 song by Slick Rick
"Teenage Love", a 1957 song by Frankie Lymon & the Teenagers
"Teenage Love", a song by Michael Cox
"Teenage Love", a song by Stephen Jameson as Nosmo King
"Teenage Love", a song  by Magic Wands from Magic Love & Dreams EP
"Teenage Love", a 2011 song by Chris Akinyemi